Monte Carlo Doualiya (MCD), formerly known as RMC Moyen-Orient, is a French public radio service that broadcasts across the Arab world. It was founded in 1972 and, like Radio France Internationale (RFI) is part of France Médias Monde, the French state-owned holding company.

It produces Arabic programmes in Paris, and airs 24 hours per day to audiences in the Middle East and Maghreb over local FM transmitters, shortwave, satellite and on its website.

History

Building on the fame of the french private radio station Radio Monte Carlo (RMC), the French and Arabic-language service targeted at listeners in the Near East and northern Africa started broadcasting in 1972 as RMC Moyen-Orient, and was created by Sofirad.

At the end of 1996, Sofirad sold RMC Moyen-Orient to Radio France Internationale (itself owned by the French government). RMC Moyen-Orient changed its name to Monte Carlo Doualiya (MCD) in 2007.

Since 1972/73, the powerful 600 kW medium wave transmitter in Cape Greco, Cyprus was used. In 2019, medium wave transmission were terminated for financial reasons and declining use of medium wave propagation. The antennas at the Cap Greco transmitter site have been torn down in early November 2021.

References

External links
 

 
1972 establishments in France
Arabic-language radio stations
Radio France
Radio stations established in 1972